Vija Artmane (born Alīda Artmane; 21 August 1929 in Kaive, Sēme Parish – 11 October 2008 in Strenči) was a Latvian theatre and cinema actress.

Life and career

Childhood
Vija Artmane was born Alīda Artmane at the time when Latvia was a sovereign nation. Her father, Fricis Arnolds Artmanis, of partial Baltic German ancestry, died in an accident aged 19, just four months before she was born. Her mother Anna Regīna Zaborska, of Polish heritage, survived as a single mother by doing seasonal agricultural jobs. As a young girl, Artmane grew up playing in the fields; she was fond of wildflowers and learned to make flower arrangements and dolls in the Latvian traditional style. While her mother worked for a landlord, her master sent young Artmane to study music and dance at a ballet class for a couple of years. However, at the age of 10, young Artmane became a shepherd girl. She worked with a herd of cows for over five years and survived until the end of the Second World War. In 1946 she graduated from secondary school and had a dream of becoming a lawyer in order to make the world a better place. At the same time, she was involved in amateur acting at her school and became interested in film and theatre, and eventually, her passion for acting prevailed.

Acting career
After the war in 1946, Artmane moved to Riga, and began her studies at the Daile Theatre Second Studio, eventually staying there as a member of the troupe for the next 50 years. At the very beginning of her acting career, she changed her first name to Vija, upon a hint from her teacher and for artistic reasons. From 1946 to 1949 Artmane studied acting under the tutelage of the Latvian theatre director Eduards Smiļģis, the original founder of the troupe. From 1949 to 1998 Artmane was the leading star of the troupe at the Daile Theatre in Riga. She played her best stage roles under the directorship of Smiļģis. Her most memorable stage works were such classic roles as Juliet in Romeo and Juliet (1953), and Ophelia in Hamlet among other Shakespeare plays. Artmane
also created important roles in Latvian plays such as Indulis and Ārija and Fire and Night under the direction of the National Actor of Latvia Rainis. She was critically acclaimed for her stage works in Russian plays, such as her passionate performance as Tolstoy's heroine Anna Karenina; she also played in Tolstoy's War and Peace, in Gogol's Dead Souls, and other classic Russian plays. After the death of Smiļģis, in 1966, Artmane gradually switched to contemporary plays, but she also continued to perform some of her classic stage roles during the 1970s and 1980s.

From 1998 to 2000 she worked with the New Riga Theatre. There she appeared in the title role in a stage production of The Queen of Spades based on the eponymous short story by Alexander Pushkin.

Recognition
In 1956, Artmane was already a recognised star of the Latvian stage, when she made her film debut in Posle shtorma (After the Storm). In 1963 she shot to fame in the Soviet Union with her leading role as Sonya, a beautiful and loving mother, opposite Evgeni Matveev in the popular film Blood Ties (1964). After that film Artmane was nicknamed "Mother-Latvia" in her homeland. She enjoyed a steady film career in the Soviet Union during the 1960s, 1970s, and 1980s. Her film career was highlighted with such roles as Veda Kong in the popular science fiction film Tumannost' Andromedy (1967), as Empress Catherine the Great in the historical drama Yemelyan Pugachyov (1978), as Julia Lamber in the film Teātris (1978) and other notable film works. Vija Artmane appeared as herself in a documentary on her life entitled Conversation with the Queen (1980) which was produced at the Riga Film Studio.

Legacy
Vija Artmane is regarded as one of the leading figures of Latvian culture. During the period of Soviet control, Artmane took an active part in the movement for preservation and support of Latvian national heritage; she has been an active proponent for the use of the Latvian language in literature and art, as well as in everyday life. She was named "People's Artist of the Latvian SSR" in 1965 and recognised as a People's Artist of the USSR in 1969. The same year she was a member of the jury at the 6th Moscow International Film Festival.

In 1999 Artmane was given an award by the Latvian Ministry of Culture for her contribution to the art of theatre and cinema. In 2003 she received the special Theatre Prize for her long-standing contribution to Latvian culture. In 2007 Vija Artmane was decorated with the Order of the Three Stars, which is conferred in recognition of outstanding civil merit in the service of Latvia.

The asteroid 4136 Artmane discovered on 1968 March was named in her honour.

Personal life and death
Vija Artmane was married to Latvian actor Artūrs Dimiters, and the couple had two children – musician Kaspars Dimiters (1957) and artist Kristiāna Dimitere (1965). In 1986, after the death of her husband, she suffered from an emotional breakdown and later had a stroke. In the 1990s, Artmane moved out of the city of Riga due to a money shortage and settled in the countryside. In the early 2000s, she converted to Eastern Orthodoxy. In 2004 she published a book of memoirs covering her acting career as well as her personal life.

Following her death on 11 October 2008 at age 79, she was interred at Pokrov Cemetery in Riga.

Filmography
 1958 — Alien in the Village — Elsa
 1962 — A Day Without an Evening — Kaire
 1963 — Native Blood —  Sonya
 1963 — Introduction to Life — Neighbor
 1964 — Rockets Shouldn't Take Off — Pearl
 1966 — Edgar and Kristina — Kristina
 1967 — Farhad's Feat — Vera
 1967 — Nobody Wanted to Die — Ona
 1967 — Strong with Spirit — Lydia Lisovskaya
 1967 — The Andromeda Nebula — Veda Kong
 1968 — Surveyor Times — Lien
 1969 — Triple Check —  Frau Greta
 1969 — Rays in Glass —  Iris
 1970 — The Ballad of Bering and His Friends —  Anna Bering
 1972 — Spruce in the Rye —  Dagmar
 1973 — Gift to a Lonely Woman —  Knepikha-Gita
 1975 — The Arrows of Robin Hood — Kat
 1976 — Master —  Aina Petrovna
 1977 — Exchange —  Jadwiga Ziliuwiene
 1978 — Pugachev —  Catherine II
 1978 — Theatre —  Julia Lambert
 1978 — Your Son — Mother
 1980 — State Border — Zinaida Kirillovna
 1981 —  Investigation Established —  Ruta Yanovna Graudina
 1981 — The Larks —  Gundega
 1986 —  The Secret of the Snow Queen —  Mrs. Autumn
 1987 — Man of the Retinue —  Aglaya Andreevna
 1987 — Moonzund — Frau Milykh
 1990 — Hearse —  Evgenia Andreevna
 1990 — Only for Crazy — Zina 
 1991 — Love —  Marina's grandmother
 1999 — Kamenskaya — Regina Arkadievna Walter
 2003 —  Golden Age — Catherine II

Awards and honours
 Honoured Artist of the Latvian SSR (1956)
 People's Artist of the Latvian SSR (1965)
 People's Artist of the USSR (1969)
 Order of Lenin (1979)
 Order of Friendship (Russia, 2004)
 Order of the Three Stars (22 October 2007)
 Winner of the All-Union Film Festival (1964, 1968).
 Laureate of State Prize of the Latvian SSR (1980)
 Prize named Lilita Berzina (1987)
 Prize named Bertha Rumnietse (1996)
 Prize II All-Russian Festival "New Russian Cinema" (2001)
 Top award for lifelong contribution to Latvian arts (2003)

References

Sources
 Biography of Vija Artmane by: Steve Shelokhonov
 Artmane Vija, "Ziemcieši. Mirkļi no manas dzīves", Pētergailis, 2004. Dokumentary prose, memoirs.
 Eduards Smiļģis Theatre Museum, Pārdaugava, Riga, Latvia.

Bibliography

External links

 И жизнь, и слёзы, и любовь… — интервью сына Вии Артмане, Каспарса Димитерса газете «Бульвар Гордона»
 Женская тайна Вии Артмане

1929 births
2008 deaths
People from Tukums Municipality
Latvian people of Baltic German descent
Latvian people of Polish descent
Latvian film actresses
Latvian stage actresses
Soviet film actresses
Soviet stage actresses
20th-century Latvian actresses
Heroes of Socialist Labour
People's Artists of the USSR
People's Artists of the Latvian Soviet Socialist Republic
Recipients of the Order of Lenin